Sia is a genus of Orthopteran insects in the family Stenopelmatidae, recorded from western Malesia.

Species
The Orthoptera Species File lists:
 Sia bugajus Gorochov, 2021
 Sia ferox Giebel, 1861 - type species
 Sia incisa Karny, 1926

References 

Ensifera genera
Stenopelmatoidea